Carola Ivena Meikle (née Dickinson) was a British algologist. She was born in 1900 in Alston, Cumberland, and died in 1970 in Wootton Courtenay, Somerset. Meikle was the author of British Seaweeds, published in 1963 as part of the Kew Series by Eyre and Spottiswoode.

She was born on 27 April 1900 and for much of her working life studied Algae at the Kew Herbarium. She married her co-worker Robert Meikle OBE who was at the time editing the Kew Series of Natural History Books. 
And so thus British Seaweeds was published in 1963, under Carola's maiden name Carola Ivena Dickinson. (dJm April 2017)

Published
Dickinson, Carol I. 1963. British Seaweeds. The Kew Series.

Sources

1900 births
1970 deaths
People from Alston, Cumbria